Rasiah Ranjith Leon (born February 6, 1968) is a Norwegian entrepreneur who, with Ratheesan Yoganathan and Baskaran Kandiah, is best known as the co-founder of Lebara Group where he still is a Director and one of the controlling shareholders. Rasiah R. Leon holds a BSc degree in physics. Rasiah Ranjith Leon was born in Jaffna, Northern Province, Sri Lanka.

Career
In Sri Lanka Rasiah R Leon founded Pentag Asia Group at the age of 21, growing it to a successful company with more than 500 employees. Upon arriving in Norway and getting political asylum he start working as a cleaner and later as a sorter at the Norwegian Post. Starting first part-time as a seller for the calling card company Telesenter Scandinavia, he rapidly raised to the position of Sales Director for Norway.

In 2001, he made friends with two other Tamil colleagues, Ratheesan Yoganathan and Baskaran Kandiah, who eventually became his business partners creating Lebara Group.

Business
In 2001, Rasiah Leon, Baskaran Kandiah and Ratheesan Yoganathan founded the Lebara Group, a company which they still own and operate successfully. The three partners have later ventured into other business areas with their mutually owned LBR Investments BV which again mainly invest in hotels and real estate.

Rasiah Leon's ownership in Lebara Group BV and LBR Investments BV is organised through the Norwegian investment company, Leon Holding AS.

Charity
Rasiah Ranjith Leon, along with co-founders Ratheesan Yoganathan and Baskaran Kandiah started Lebara Foundation, a charitable venture in 2005, formally established in 2008. Lebara Foundation is currently involved in charitable projects helping vulnerable children and displaced communities in 13 countries on all continents. His next big ambition is to expand Lebara Foundation further. To fund continued development, he plans to donate half his wealth to the foundation. RBS has been asked to run a review, which it is hoped will lead to a sale at around £650m.

References
Article in Norwegian magazine Utrop
Article in Norwegian newspaper Aftenposten
Article in Norwegian newspaper Aften

Sri Lankan emigrants to Norway
Refugees in Norway
1968 births
Living people
Sri Lankan Tamil businesspeople